Lasse Thillitz Andersen (born 24 May 1995) is a Danish professional footballer who plays as a defender for Kjellerup IF.

Career
Andersen started his senior career with Viborg FF in the Danish Superliga, where he made one league appearance. After that, he played for Kjellerup IF and Faroe club Havnar Bóltfelag. He joined Skive IK in February 2020. However, due to injuries, he was forced to take a break from playing in August 2020.

In the summer 2021, Andersen began training with his former club Kjellerup IF and in March 2022, he signed a contract with the club.

References

External links 
 Lasse Andersen Faroe interview (1)
 Lasse Andersen Faroe interview (2)
 Lasse Andersen Faroe interview (3)
 HB Dane cheers for redemption championship
 A bold choice has given Lasse several cards on hand
 Former Viborg talent heading to the Champions League

1995 births
Living people
Danish men's footballers
Danish expatriate men's footballers
Association football defenders
Danish Superliga players
Faroe Islands Premier League players
Viborg FF players
Kjellerup IF players
Havnar Bóltfelag players
Skive IK players
Expatriate footballers in the Faroe Islands